Moskva (literally: Moscow) is a Russian Project 21900 diesel-electric icebreaker. Built at Baltic Shipyard in 2008, she was the first non-nuclear-powered icebreaker built in Russia after the dissolution of the Soviet Union.

Moskva has an identical sister ship, Sankt-Peterburg, built in 2009. In addition, three icebreakers of slightly upgraded design (Vladivostok, Murmansk and Novorossiysk) were built in 2015–2016.

Development and construction 

In July 2004, the Saint Petersburg-based Baltic Shipyard won an international tender for the construction of two 16-megawatt diesel-electric icebreakers for Rosmorport, a state-owned company established in 2003 to manage Russia's port infrastructure and operate its fleet of diesel-powered icebreakers. Although the shipyard had built five Arktika-class nuclear-powered icebreakers in 1975–1992 and had the sixth under construction at the time, these would be the first non-nuclear icebreakers built on a Russian shipyard in over three decades and the first new icebreakers ordered following the dissolution of the Soviet Union. While the state budget did not initially allocate funding for the new icebreakers, the construction was nonetheless set to begin already in 2004 and the lead ship was to be delivered by November 2006.

The keel laying ceremony of the first vessel was held on 19 May 2005 and the hull was launched on 25 May 2007, slightly behind the original schedule. At the time, technical readiness of the vessel was estimated to be 70% and the delivery was still expected by the end of the year. However, it took more than a year before the first new diesel-electric icebreaker was finally delivered to Rosmorport on 11 December 2008.

Project 21900 icebreakers are named after major Russian cities with the lead ship, Moskva, named after the capital city of Russia. Previously, the same names were used for a series of five Soviet-era diesel-electric polar icebreakers built by Wärtsilä in the 1960s; the previous Moskva was in service in 1960–1992.

Design 

Fully laden, the  icebreaker draws  of water.

Moskva has a fully integrated diesel-electric propulsion system with main diesel generators supplying power for both main propulsion as well as ship's service loads while underway. Her main power plant consists of two  9-cylinder Wärtsilä 9L32 and two  12-cylinder Wärtsilä 12V32 medium-speed diesel engines. In addition, there are two  Wärtsilä 4L20 auxiliary diesel generators for use when the vessel is at port.

For main propulsion, Moskva is fitted with two electrically driven azimuth thrusters. While the azimuthing propulsion units improve the maneuverability of the icebreaker, she is also fitted with a single transverse bow thruster.

Career 

The two Project 21900 icebreakers were originally built to ensure year-round transportation of crude oil from the terminal in Primorsk. In addition, she was designed to carry out various secondary tasks such as firefighting and oil spill response operations.

Since 2016, Moskva has occasionally been stationed in the Arctic LNG terminal of Sabetta in the Gulf of Ob during the winter months.

Moskva has participated in the annual Festival of Icebreakers in Saint Petersburg once. The icebreaker was open to visitors in 2015.

References 

Project 21900 icebreakers
2007 ships